Hans Multscher (ca. 1400–1467) was a German sculptor and painter.

Multscher was born in Reichenhofen (today Leutkirch im Allgäu).

He made himself acquainted with new artistic styles from northern France and the Netherlands, and became a free citizen of the city of Ulm in 1427. There, he married Adelheid Kitzin the same year. He ran his own business as a painter and sculptor, together with his brother Heinrich Multscher.

Multscher died in Ulm.

Works

References

External links

1467 deaths
People from Leutkirch im Allgäu
15th-century German painters
German male painters
15th-century German sculptors
German male sculptors
Gothic sculptors
Gothic painters
Year of birth uncertain